Equipe Nürnberger Versicherung (from 2010 Equipe Noris Cycling) was the name of a Nuremberg women's professional cycling team with UCI Women's Team status up to and including the 2009 season. The name was given by the main sponsor Nürnberger Versicherung. Due to its dominating position, also internationally, the team formed the skeleton of the German national team in women's road cycling.

The best-known rider was former road world champion Regina Schleicher, who ended her career in 2009. In addition, German runner-up Trixi Worrack and Edita Pučinskaitė (Lithuania) were among the team's figureheads.

The team's manager was Herbert Oppelt. The team's sporting management was taken over by ex-national coach Jochen Dornbusch (JoDo for short) from Jens Zemke. Dornbusch left the team at the end of June 2010. He was succeeded by Dutchman Thijs Rondhuis.

In August 2009, a new main sponsor for the team was found in the yacht company "Skyter". In early December 2009, the company surprisingly announced its withdrawal. In the 2010 season, the team therefore competed under the name Equipe Noris Cycling. The name was derived from the Latin name for Nuremberg, Noricum. The team disbanded at the end of the 2010 season.

History

2006

2010 roster 

Ages as of 1 January 2010.

Major wins 

2004
Liberty Classic, Petra Rossner
2005
Overall Geelong Tour, Oenone Wood
Stages 2 & 4, Oenone Wood
Stage 4 Tour of New Zealand, Judith Arndt
Primavera Rosa, Trixi Worrack
GP Liberazione – WE, Regina Schleicher
Overall Gracia–Orlová, Judith Arndt
Stages 1 & 4, Judith Arndt
Vuelta a Castilla y León – WE, Judith Arndt
Stages 1, 3a & 6 Tour de l'Aude Cycliste Féminin, Oenone Wood
Stage 9 Tour de l'Aude Cycliste Féminin, Trixi Worrack
Overall Tour du Grand Montréal, Oenone Wood
Stages 1b & 2, Oenone Wood
Stages 3b & 4 Iurreta-Emakumeen Bira, Trixi Worrack
Stage 2 Giro d'Italia Femminile, Regina Schleicher
Tour de Feminin – Krasna Lipa, Tina Liebig
GP of Wales, Judith Arndt
Stages 1, 2 & 3 Holland Ladies Tour, Regina Schleicher
2006
Trofeo Alfredo Binda, Regina Schleicher
Grand Prix de Dottignies, Oenone Wood
Geelong Tour, Oenone Wood
Stage 7a Tour de l'Aude Cycliste Féminin, Oenone Wood
Stage 3 Tour du Grand Montréal, Katherine Bates
Liberty Classic, Regina Schleicher
Stages 2 & 9 Giro d'Italia Femminile, Regina Schleicher
Stage 8 Giro d'Italia Femminile, Oenone Wood
GP Carnevale d'Europa, Regina Schleicher
Sparkassen Giro Bochum, Oenone Wood
Stages 1 & 4a Boels Ladies Tour, Regina Schleicher
Stage 4 Euregio Ladies Tour, Katherine Bates
Rund um die Nürnberger Altstadt – WE, Regina Schleicher
2007
Drentse 8 van Dwingeloo, Regina Schleicher
Berner-Rundfahrt – WE, Edita Pučinskaitė
Stage 8b Tour de l'Aude Cycliste Féminin, Trixi Worrack
Stages 1 & 2 Tour du Grand Montréal, Regina Schleicher
Durango-Durango Emakumeen Saria, Edita Pučinskaitė
Overall Giro del Trentino Alto Adige-Südtirol, Edita Pučinskaitė
Stages 1 & 2, Edita Pučinskaitė
Overall Giro d'Italia Femminile, Edita Pučinskaitė
Prologie & Stage 3, Edita Pučinskaitė
Stage 4 Tour de Feminin – Krasna Lipa, Andrea Graus
Stage 2 International Thüringen Rundfahrt der Frauen, Regina Schleicher
Albstadt-Frauen-Etappenrennen, Trixi Worrack
Stage 6 Boels Ladies Tour, Regina Schleicher
Giro della Toscana Femminile, Regina Schleicher
2008
Stage 1 Tour of New Zealand, Suzanne de Goede
GP Liberazione – WE, Regina Schleicher
Stage 1 Tour du Grand Montréal, Regina Schleicher
Stage 4 Tour du Grand Montréal, Suzanne de Goede
Stage 3b Iurreta-Emakumeen Bira, Regina Schleicher
Stage 1 Giro del Trentino Alto Adige, Regina Schleicher
Stage 6 Giro d'Italia Femminile, Claudia Häusler
International Thüringen Rundfahrt der Frauen, Trixi Worrack
Sparkassen Giro Bochum, Suzanne de Goede
Draai van de Kaai, Christina Becker
Holland Hills Classic, Larissa Kleinmann
Overall Albstadt-Frauen-Etappenrennen, Trixi Worrack
Prologue, Stages 1 & 2, Trixi Worrack
Boels Ladies Tour, Charlotte Becker
2009
Stage 2 Ladies Tour of Qatar, Eva Lutz
Omloop Het Nieuwsblad, Suzanne de Goede
Stages 2 & 4 Tour of Chongming Island, Marlen Johrend
Overall Gracia–Orlová, Trixi Worrack
Stage 3, Amber Neben
Stage 6  Tour de l'Aude Cycliste Féminin, Trixi Worrack
Stage 1 Giro del Trentino Alto Adige, Regina Schleicher
Stage 2 Rabobank Ster Zeeuwsche Eilanden, Suzanne de Goede
Stage 2 Giro d'Italia Femminile, Amber Neben
Stage 8 Giro d'Italia Femminile, Trixi Worrack
Stage 2 International Thüringen Rundfahrt der Frauen, Charlotte Becker
Overall Albstadt-Frauen-Etappenrennen, Charlotte Becker
Stage 1, Charlotte Becker
Stage 2, Lisa Brennauer
2010
Halle-Buizingen, Jennifer Hohl
Overall Tour de Feminin – Krasna Lipa, Trixi Worrack
Stages 1, 2, 3a, 3b & 4, Trixi Worrack

National champions
2005
  Australian Time Trial Championship, Oenone Wood
  German Road Championship, Regina Schleicher
  German Time Trial Championship, Judith Arndt
  World Road Championship, Regina Schleicher
2006
  Australian Road Championship, Katherine Bates
  German Road Championship, Claudia Häusler
2007
  Lithuanian Time Trial Championship, Edita Pučinskaitė
2008
  Lithuanian Road Championship, Modesta Vžesniauskaitė
2009
  German Time Trial Championship, Trixi Worrack

References

External links 
 Official site

UCI Women's Teams
Cycling teams based in Germany
Sport in Nuremberg
Cycling teams disestablished in 2010
Cycling teams established in 2004
Noris Cycling